Nashik Thermal Power Plant is located at Eklahare village near Nashik in Maharashtra. The power plant is one of the coal based power plants of Maharashtra State Power Generation Company (Mahagenco)

Power Plant
Nashik Thermal Power Station has an installed capacity of 140*2+210*3=910 MW. The first unit was commissioned in 1970. the cost of unit including civil works was Rs 56.5 crores. and the second unit also commissioned with the same cost under the first stage.
the second stage consists of three units of 210 MW each was commissioned in the later years.
the power station campus includes self-contained township with all amenities.  The entire land consists of 474 hectares.
The power plant has got ISO Certification in April 2002. The first head of the Power station was Sri Karanjkar assisted by Sri CL Gupta and Sri Sen Gupta.Sri Sen Gupta was assisted in Boiler Maintenance department by Sri C.N.Swamy and the Turbine maintenance department was headed by Sri Agashe.

The Second stage of Power station 3x210 MW was started in April 1976. Sri C.N.Swamy was appointed as the first Project Manager to oversee the construction and commissioning of power plant. The first unit was commissioned in 1980.

Installed Capacity

Maharashtra State Power Generation Company (Mahagenco) is planning to deploy 660 MW super-critical unit at the same location just like the current plant. This project will be stationed adjacent to the existing stage-I plant (2 x 140 MW) site at village Eklahare. Land requirement for the proposed project is about 36.6 hectares. The coal sources will be from Mahanadi coal blocks by MahaGuj Collierie s. The total cost of the project is around Rs 4,390 crore, 20% contribution will be by the State Government amounting to Rs 878 crore. The remaining funds will be supported from several lending institutions.

Transport
It is on the Bhusawal–Kalyan section of Central Railway. Coal-based thermal power stations consume large quantities of coal. The Nasik Thermal Power Station consumed 4,626,000 tones of coal in 2006–07. Around 80 per cent of the domestic coal supplies in India are meant for coal based thermal power plants and coal transportation forms 42 per cent of the total freight earnings of Indian railways.

References

External links

 Information about Nashik Thermal Power Station

Coal-fired power stations in Maharashtra
Economy of Nashik
1970 establishments in Maharashtra
Energy infrastructure completed in 1970
20th-century architecture in India